Paul Charles Halleck (July 11, 1913 – March 23, 1974) was an American football end who played one season with the Cleveland Rams of the National Football League. He played college football at Ohio University and attended Wayne Township High School in Williamsfield, Ohio.

References

External links
Just Sports Stats

1913 births
1974 deaths
Players of American football from Youngstown, Ohio
American football ends
Ohio Bobcats football players
Cleveland Rams players